The São Paulo International Motor Show (Salão International do Automóvel de São Paulo) is the biggest and most important automotive event in Latin America. The São Paulo International Motor Show has been held in São Paulo, Brazil since 1960. Originally being held irregularly, it has been a biannual show since 1984 (although there was no 2020 edition due to the coronavirus pandemic). In 1990 the event became internationalized and the domestic industry showed its capacity for global competition.

Locations
The original six exhibitions took place at the centrally located Ibirapuera Park. From 1970 until 2014, the Show was held indoors, at the Anhembi Convention Center.

1960 
The inaugural edition opened on 25 November 1960. 12 manufacturers were represented and 400,000 visitors - including domestic automobile industry champion, President Juscelino Kubitschek - attended.

1961 
At the second show, premieres included the Willys Interlagos, the Simca Chambord, and a revamped Volkswagen 1200.

1962 
The third edition included the premieres of the locally produced Volkswagen Karmann Ghia (Typ 14) and the Vemag Fissore, as well as the Toyota Bandeirante, the Scania L-75, and the Chevrolet Amazona trucks.

1964 
With the fourth edition, the show adopted its current biannual schedule. The impact of Brazil's economy and political situations have, however, sometimes led to three-year gaps and occasionally to successive shows. This was the first year that the show was held under the military dictatorship. Volkswagen and Ford both boycotted the event.

The biggest premiere was the 1965 Aero Willys; lesser stars included the limited production Brasinca Uirapuru, the Chevrolet Veraneio utility vehicle, and the Vemaguet Rio.

2010 
The 26th motor show was held between 25 October to 7 November.

Production car introductions

 Chevrolet Montana

Concept car introductions

 Fiat Uno Cabrio concept 
 Fiat Mio concept
 Rossin-Bertin Vorax 
 Volkswagen RockeT concept

2012 
The 27th edition was held from 24 October to 4 November 2012.

Production car introductions (local)

 Bugatti Veyron Grand Sport Vitesse Rafale
 Chery Riich M1 REEV 
 Chevrolet Onix
 Fiat Grand Siena "Sublime"
 Fiat Linea "Sublime"
 Fiat Palio Sporting "Interlagos"
 Fiat Uno Sporting "Interlagos"
 Honda Fit Twist
 Hyundai HB20
 Hyundai HB20X
 Mahindra Quanto
 Mercedes-Benz SLS 63 AMG GT3 "45th Anniversary"
 Mitsubishi Lancer Evolution X Carbon Series
 Nissan Frontier "10 Anos"
 Nissan LEAF Taxi
 Nissan March Rio 2016
 Nissan Sentra "Special Edition"
 Peugeot Hoggar Quiksilver 
 Renault Novo Clio 
 Renault Fluence GT
 Renault Sandero GT
 Suzuki Jimny 4SUN
 Suzuki Jimny 4ALL
 Suzuki Jimny 4WORK
 Suzuki Jimny 4SPORT
 Toyota Etios
 Toyota Prius GS
 Troller T4
 Volvo V60 Racing
 Volkswagen CrossFox
 Volkswagen Saveiro Cross
 Volkswagen Space Cross 
 Volkswagen Gol 3-door

Concept car introductions

 Fiat Bravo Xtreme Concept
 Ford Evos Yellow Concept
 Nissan EXTREM Concept
 Renault DCross Concept
 Toyota iiMo Concept
 Toyota TS030 Hybrid (Le Mans sports car)
 Troller R-X Concept
 Volkswagen Taigun Concept

2014 
The 28th edition was held between 30 October and 9 November 2014.

2016 
The 29th edition was held between 10 and 20 November 2016.

2018 
The 30th edition was held between 9 and 18 November 2018.

References

External links 
 

Auto shows
Tourist attractions in São Paulo